Helena Dąbrowska (26 June 1923 – 31 May 2003) was a Polish actress. She appeared in more than twenty films and television shows between 1954 and 1981.

Selected filmography
 Night Train (1959)
 Bad Luck (1960)
 Black Wings (1963)
 Pięciu (1964)

References

External links

1923 births
2003 deaths
Polish film actresses
Polish stage actresses
People from Białobrzegi County
Recipient of the Meritorious Activist of Culture badge